Frazier Climo (born 6 February 1987 in Stratford, New Zealand) is a Scotland Club XV international rugby union player. He plays for the Ayrshire Bulls in the Super 6.

He played on the wing (and occasionally fullback) for the Scarlets

Life & Career

Climo previously played for Scottish Premiership side Ayr RFC and Taranaki in the ITM Cup, where he had a kicking percentage of over 80% success rate. He signed for the Scarlets in July 2013.

References

External links 
 

1987 births
New Zealand rugby union players
Living people
Scarlets players
Taranaki rugby union players
Rugby union players from Stratford, New Zealand
New Zealand expatriate sportspeople in Wales
Scotland Club XV international rugby union players
Ayr RFC players
Rugby union wings